Spiralix is a genus of very small aquatic snails, operculate gastropod mollusks in the family Moitessieriidae.

Species
 Spiralix affinitatis Boeters, 2003
 Spiralix asturica Quiñonero-Salgado, Ruiz-Cobo & Rolán, 2017
 Spiralix burgensis Boeters, 2003
 Spiralix burgundina (Locard, 1883)
 Spiralix calida Corbella, Guillén, Prats, Tarruella & Alba, 2014
 Spiralix clarae Quiñonero-Salgado, Ruiz-Cobo & Rolán, 2017
 Spiralix collieri (Nicolas, 1891)
 Spiralix cubelli Quiñonero-Salgado, López-Soriano, Á. Alonso & Rolán, 2020
 Spiralix gloriae (Rolán & Martínez-Ortí, 2003)
 Spiralix gusii Quiñonero-Salgado, López-Soriano, Á. Alonso & Rolán, 2020
 Spiralix heisenbergi Quiñonero-Salgado, Á. Alonso & Rolán, 2021
 Spiralix hofmanni Boeters & Falkner, 2003
 Spiralix kuiperi Boeters & Falkner, 2009
 Spiralix mieraensis Quiñonero-Salgado, Ruiz-Cobo & Rolán, 2017
 Spiralix ovidiensis Girardi & Bertrand, 2009
 Spiralix pequenoensis Boeters, 2003
 Spiralix puteana (Coutagne, 1883)
 Spiralix rayi (Bourguignat, 1883)
 Spiralix thaisensis Girardi, 2009
 Spiralix tuba Quiñonero-Salgado, Á. Alonso & Rolán, 2019
 Spiralix valenciana Boeters, 2003
 Spiralix vetusta'' Quiñonero-Salgado, Á. Alonso & Rolán, 2018
 Spiralix vitrea (Draparnaud, 1801)
Synonyms
 Spiralix corsica (R. Bernasconi, 1994) : synonym of Corseria corsica'' (R. Bernasconi, 1994) (new combination)

References

 Boeters, H. D. (1972). Westeuropaische Moitessieriidae, 1. Spiralix n. subgen. (Prosobranchia). Archiv für Molluskenkunde. 102: 99–106.

External links
 Boeters, H. D. (2003). Supplementary notes on Moitessieriidae and Hydrobiidae from the Iberian Peninsula (Gastropoda, Caenogastropoda). Basteria. 67(1/3): 1-41

Gastropod genera
Moitessieriidae